Alec Van Hoorenbeeck (born 30 December 1998) is a Belgian footballer who plays for Mechelen.

Career
He was sent on a season-long loan to Helmond Sport on 15 August 2020 as part of a new cooperation agreement between Mechelen and Helmond Sport.

Honours
Mechelen
 Belgian Cup: 2018–19

References

Living people
1998 births
Association football defenders
Belgian footballers
Belgian expatriate footballers
K.V. Mechelen players
K.S.K. Heist players
Helmond Sport players
Belgian Pro League players
Belgian Third Division players
Eerste Divisie players
Expatriate footballers in the Netherlands
Belgian expatriate sportspeople in the Netherlands
People from Mortsel
Footballers from Antwerp Province